Engine Company No. 4 is located in Hoboken, Hudson County, New Jersey, United States. The firehouse was designed by Francis G. Himpler and was built in 1870. The firehouse was added to the National Register of Historic Places on March 30, 1984.

See also
National Register of Historic Places listings in Hudson County, New Jersey

References

Buildings and structures in Hoboken, New Jersey
Defunct fire stations in New Jersey
Fire stations completed in 1870
Fire stations on the National Register of Historic Places in New Jersey
National Register of Historic Places in Hudson County, New Jersey
New Jersey Register of Historic Places